Gordon Cheng is an Australian Christian author and writer. He is a Bible teacher at the Sydney Conservatorium of Music, employed by the Australian Fellowship of Evangelical Students. Prior to this he was Campus Director (Australian Fellowship of Evangelical Students) with the Cumberland Campus of Sydney University. For several years he was the Resources Editor of Matthias Media (a non-denominational Christian publisher based in Sydney). He is also an Anglican presbyter (or priest) in the Diocese of Sydney.

Early life
Of Swedish and Chinese descent, Cheng was ordained in the Anglican Diocese of Melbourne.

Work
Cheng worked for 10 years as a senior staff worker with the Australian Fellowship of Evangelical Students at the University of Melbourne and then ministered at a number of churches in Sydney. He was employed by Matthias Media from February 2004 to January 2009 to work on their resources other than its flagship magazine, The Briefing.

Cheng is also an active member of the Anglican Diocese of Sydney. He ministers at St Paul's Church, Carlingford, and from 2004 to 2006 he was involved in the "Cumberland University Church", ministering to the Cumberland Campus of Sydney University.

Writings
Cheng is the author of several books and other resources published by Matthias Media, including the Pathway Bible Guides Bible study series, and his first book/multimedia publication with Matthias, the Six Steps to Encouragement course. He is an associate of the Anglican Dean of Sydney, Phillip Jensen, and has edited several of his books.

Since the mid-1990s, Cheng has also written numerous articles for The Briefing, a popular evangelical journal distributed in Australia, England and the United States. He is a critic of the ordination of women to the priesthood and homosexuality and has written on the priority of Christian ministry over secular work.

Cheng sends numerous letter to online and print media, some of which were published in the Sydney Morning Herald and other newspapers, and he posts regularly on many websites and forums, including the Sydney diocese's "Sydney Anglican"s website where several of his articles have also been published. He has also posted on the Ship of Fools website. His posts defended the actions of a church which was the subject of a defamation lawsuit, involving the sacking of a female lay worker. More recently, Cheng has been a guest opinion writer for Sydney's Daily Telegraph and Sunday Telegraph newspapers, writing opinion pieces on religious and ethical issues, including Lent, euthanasia, and racism, In late 2006 he was also enlisted by Daily Telegraph columnist Piers Akerman to be a guest writer for a Muslim-Christian debate run by the paper on multiculturalism; others participating included Lebanese Muslim representative Keysar Trad.

Personal life
Cheng is married and has three children, Matilda, Ruby and Lily.

References

Year of birth missing (living people)
Australian journalists
Living people
20th-century Australian Anglican priests
Clergy from Sydney
21st-century Australian Anglican priests
Moore Theological College alumni
Australian people of Chinese descent
Australian people of Swedish descent